Diglis is a suburb of Worcester, England. It is located around half a mile south of the city centre on the banks of the River Severn. The Worcester and Birmingham Canal starts in Diglis where it is connected to the Severn. Diglis Lock is a wide-beam lock allowing river craft access to Diglis Basin. Diglis Island is a sliver of land in the middle of the River Severn opposite the opening of The Worcester and Birmingham Canal, which has featured art displays and tours. Diglis House Hotel sits on the banks of the River Severn to the south of Worcester Cathedral. The area immediately next to the river is often affected by flooding such as in autumn 2000 and summer 2007. New apartments have been built in Diglis and there has been some investment in the waterfront areas which are popular with tourists. Diglis Bridge, a pedestrian and cycle bridge across the Severn, opened in 2010 linking Diglis and St Peter's with Lower Wick. In 2021, Princess Anne opened a fish viewing gallery at the Severn Bridge.

References

Geography of Worcester, England